The following is a list of squads for each nation competing at the 2009 World Baseball Classic. The tournament started on March 5, 2009.

Each participating national federation had a deadline of January 19, 2009 to submit a 45-man provisional roster. Final rosters of 28 players, which also must include a minimum of 13 pitchers and two catchers, were submitted on February 24. If a player on the submitted roster is unable to play, usually due to injury, he can be substituted at any time before the start of the tournament. Roster changes during the competition are restricted to the breaks between rounds of competition—for example, a player who is injured during pool play could not be replaced during the pool phase, but could be replaced if his team advanced to the second round.

Team affiliations on all rosters, and player ages, are current as of the opening day of the tournament.

Pool A

Manager: 77  Terry Collins
Coaches: 66  Brent Strom, 72 Aiping Wang, 29 Sheng Yi

Manager: 3 Chih-Hsien Yeh (葉志仙)
Coaches: 88 Tai-Yuan Kuo (郭泰源), 26 Kong-Hui Wang (王光輝), 70 Wen-Sheng Lu (呂文生), 6 Chen Wei-Cheng (陳威成), 65 Lin Kun-Han (林琨瀚), 68 Cheng-Hao Wang (王宸浩)

Manager: 83 Tatsunori Hara (原辰徳)
Coaches: 73 Koichi Ogata, 72 Tsutomu Itō, 71 Hisashi Yamada, 92 Tsuyoshi Yoda, 81 Kazunori Shinozuka, 63 Nobuhiro Takashiro

Manager: 81 Kim In-sik (김인식, 金寅植)
Coaches: 80 Kim Sung-han (김성한, 金城漢), 79 Yang Sang-moon (양상문, 楊相文), 78 Lee Soon-chul (이순철, 李順喆), 77 Ryu Joong-il (류중일, 柳仲逸), 75 Kang Sung-woo (강성우, 姜盛友), 76 Kim Min-ho (김민호, 金敏浩)

Pool B

Manager: 24 Jon Deeble
Coaches: 33 Paul Elliot, 10 Pat Kelly, 27 Graeme Lloyd, 2 Tony Harris, 43 Philip Dale

Manager: 39 Higinio Vélez
Coaches: 41 Francisco Escaurido, 22 Enrique Cepero, 34 Jose Elosegui, 30 Pedro Perez, 21 Lourdes Gourriel

Manager: 9 Vinny Castilla
Coaches: 34 Fernando Valenzuela, 49 Teddy Higuera, 44 Armando Reynoso, 20 José Tolentino, 6 Ever Magallanes, 5 Houston Jiménez

Manager: Rick Magnante
Coaches:  Lee Smith, Brian McArn, Mike Randall, Neil Adonis, Alan Phillips

  California

Pool C

Manager: 21 Ernie Whitt
Coaches: 3 Larry Walker, 49 Paul Quantrill, 42 Denis Boucher, 34 Tim Leiper, 27 Greg Hamilton, 20 Greg O'Halloran

Manager: 5 Marco Mazzieri
Coaches: 21 Mike Hargrove, 26 Tom Trebelhorn, 23 Alberto D'Auria, 1 William Holmberg, 31 Mike Piazza, 33 Gilberto Gerali

Manager: 5 Davey Johnson
Coaches: 8 Reggie Smith, 27 Marcel Lachemann, 11 Barry Larkin, 3 Billy Ripken, 20 Mike Schmidt, 30 Mel Stottlemyre

Manager: 8 Luis Sojo
Coaches: 41 Andrés Galarraga, 20 Tony Armas, 34 Omar Malavé, 5 Oscar Escobar, 10 Roberto Espinoza, 33 Luis Dorante

Pool D

Manager: 17 Felipe Alou
Coaches: 55 Luis Pujols, 32 Mario Soto, 6 Junior Noboa, 4 Alfredo Griffin, 19 Luis Silverio, 31 Ramon Henderson

Manager: 6 Rod Delmonico
Coaches: Bert Blyleven, 26 Bill Froberg, 34 Wim Martinus, 32 Hensley Meulens, Jim Stoeckel, Ben Thijssen

Manager: 11 Héctor López
Coaches: 53 Ricardo Medina, 56 Len Picota, 24 Allan Lewis, 43 Luis Ortiz, 5 Luis Molina

Manager: José Oquendo
Coaches: Carlos Arroyo, Eduardo Pérez, Iván DeJesús, Charlie Montoyo, Gil Rondon, Jerry Morales

Notes

References
Rosters:

World Baseball Classic
Rosters, 2009 World Baseball Classic